William John Kowalski III (born August 3, 1970 in Parma, Ohio) is an American-Canadian novelist and screenwriter. He is the author of Eddie's Bastard (1999), Somewhere South of Here (2001), The Adventures of Flash Jackson (2003), and The Good Neighbor (2004).

Youth
Kowalski is the eldest child of Dr. William John Kowalski, Jr. of Buffalo, N.Y. (born  1942) and Kathleen Emily Siepel of Angola, N.Y. (b. 1942). In 1974, the family moved to Erie, Pennsylvania.  He attended Erie Day School from 1976 to 1984, Cathedral Preparatory School for Boys from 1984 to 1985, and McDowell High School from 1985 to 1988, where he played bass in the rock group Gideon Winter, which was named after a major character in the novel Floating Dragon by Peter Straub.  He also acted in numerous high school and community theater productions.

Literary education
Kowalski has said that he realized he wanted to be a writer when he was about six years old, and that he began to pursue that dream soon after. In 1988, Kowalski attended the Mercyhurst College Summer Writer's Institute, where he studied under Dr. Ken Schiff (founder of the institute) and the late W.S. "Jack" Kuniczak (novelist and noted translator of Sienkiewicz).  He matriculated at Boston's Emerson College in 1988, where he majored in Creative Writing, but dropped out in 1989 to devote himself to writing full-time, believing that he was focusing too much on writing at the expense of gaining the life experiences he needed to have something to write about:

We have far too many writers in America these days who are expert stylists but who really aren't writing about anything. They can write like hell, but they don't have much to say, because they haven't done anything except study writing. As soon as I realized I was in danger of having this happen to me, I dropped out of college ...  Life makes writers--nothing else does.

As a result, he took a year off from school and worked at two now-defunct Boston bookstores, Avenue Victor Hugo and Globe Corner Bookstore.

In 1990, Kowalski matriculated at St. John's College in Santa Fe, New Mexico, a four-year program whose curriculum consists of the "Great Books" of Western Civilization, including not only literature, but also philosophy, mathematics, the sciences, music and art. He believes this program made him "more well-rounded, and as a result, a more interesting person ... ".

Kowalski has stated that his literary influences include Ernest Hemingway and John Irving, Spanish-language authors Isabel Allende and Gabriel García Márquez, and more-populist authors like spy writer John le Carré, southwestern author Tony Hillerman and sea-story writer Patrick O'Brian.

Literary career
Kowalski is the author of five works of literary fiction. Eddie's Bastard (1999), Somewhere South of Here (2001), The Adventures of Flash Jackson (2003), and The Good Neighbor (2004) were all published in the U.S. by HarperCollins and in the United Kingdom by Transworld/Doubleday/Black Swan. The Hundred Hearts (2013) was published by Thomas Allen Publishers (now Dundurn) in Canada and will be published in German by Eichborn/Luebbe in 2015.

Kowalski also writes shorter books for adults with literacy challenges, called Rapid Reads.  These are published by Orca Books' Raven imprint.  These are The Barrio Kings (April 2010), The Way It Works (2010),  Something Noble (March 2012), and Just Gone (September 2013).  His fifth Rapid Reads book, The Innocence Device, will be published by Orca/Raven in the fall of 2014.  Something Noble has been translated into Swedish and Korean.

Kowalski's work has been translated into fifteen languages and has appeared on bestseller lists around the world, including The Times of London.

Eddie's Bastard
In his New York Times review of Eddie's Bastard, William J. Cobb complemented Kowalski for his style and exuberance but faulted him for making the novel both sentimental and anachronistic. But Los Angeles Times reviewer Mark Rozzo was more impressed, rejecting the charge of sentimentality and praising the work for its "enviably gentle pacing," "unflappable good nature" and "honeyed glow".

The novel earned Kowalski a place in the Barnes & Noble Discover Great New Writers program in 1999 and won the 2001 Exclusive Books Boeke Prize (South Africa), putting his novel in the company of such other well-known novels as Midnight in the Garden of Good and Evil, The Poisonwood Bible, Life of Pi, The Kite Runner and The Girl with the Dragon Tattoo.

His sequel to Eddie's Bastard, Somewhere South of Here, was described by Elizabeth Judd as being confident and entertaining in the Kerouac mold, noting Kowalski's "talent for casual invention" and "bravado," even though it never reaches the "deeper truths" of its own story.

Other awards
 2003: The Adventures of Flash Jackson: Literary Guild Alternate Selection.   
 2011: The Barrio Kings: Golden Oak Award nomination from the Ontario Library Association. 
 2014: Something Noble: Golden Oak Award nomination from the Ontario Library Association. 
 2014: The Hundred Hearts: Thomas Raddall Atlantic Fiction Award winner from the Writers' Federation of Nova Scotia
In addition to the above literary accolades, Kowalski has one screenwriting credit, "Coyote Beach"1
1.  https://www.imdb.com/title/tt0437942/?ref_=nm_knf_t1

Personal
Kowalski is married to Alexandra Nedergaard (b. 1968) of Toronto, Ontario. They have two children.

References

External links
Official site
Curled Up With A Good Book (interview)
Overlooked Classics of American Literature (review)
The Hundred Hearts reviewed in National Post
The Hundred Hearts reviewed in Winnipeg Review
The Hundred Hearts reviewed in Globe and Mail
The Hundred Hearts on LaineyGossip.com

1970 births
Living people
20th-century American novelists
21st-century American novelists
American male novelists
American male screenwriters
American emigrants to Canada
Emerson College alumni
Mercyhurst University alumni
St. John's College (Annapolis/Santa Fe) alumni
20th-century American male writers
21st-century American male writers